Matron of Pitane (Greek: Μάτρων, Mátrōn) was an Ancient Greek poet and parodist.

Life 
Matron, a native of Pitane in Aeolis, was a celebrated writer of parodies upon Homer, often quoted by Eustathius and Athenaeus.

He was probably a contemporary of Hegemon of Thasos, about the end of the fifth and the beginning of the fourth centuries BC, but at all events he cannot be placed later than the time of Philip of Macedon. Athenaeus calls him Ματρέας (Matréas) in some places, but this is clearly an error of the transcriber.

Works

Parodies of Homer 
Aside from six brief fragments, the Δει̑πνον Ἀττικόν (Deípnon Attikón: 'Attic Dinner') survives due to extensive quotation by Athenaeus. It is a mock-epic poem in 122 hexameters, describing a luxurious Athenian feast: a continuous list of dishes furnishes the banquet, including many fish-dinners, the whole animated effectively by interweaving epic military images, which the poet skilfully adopts from Homer in a manner comparable to the cento technique.

Athenaeus quotes a long fragment from this poem, beginning: Δεῖπνα μοι ἔννεπε, Μοῦσα, πολύτροφα καὶ μάλα πολλά (‘Tell me, Muse, of the many nourishing dinners’), an obvious parody of the opening of Homer's Odyssey. Matron's parody is in the tradition of Hegemon and Archestratus.

Editions 
The fragments of his parodies were printed by H. Stephens, in the Dissertation on Parodies, appended to the Contest of Homer and Hesiod, 1573, 8vo., and in Brunck's Analecta, vol. ii. p. 245.

References

Citations

Bibliography 

 Montanari, Ornella (2006). "Matron". In Cancik, Hubert, et al. (ed.). Brill's New Pauly. Brill Reference Online.
 Montanari, Ornella and Rüpke, Jörg (2006). "Gastronomical poetry". In Cancik, Hubert, et al. (ed.). Brill's New Pauly. Brill Reference Online.
 Olson, S. D. and Sens, A. (1999). Matron of Pitane and the Tradition of Epic Parody in the Fourth Century BCE. Atlanta, Ga.: Scholars Press.
 Rusten, Jeffrey Stuart (2005). "Matron, of Pitane". In Hornblower, Simon, et al. (ed.). The Oxford Classical Dictionary. 3rd ed. Oxford University Press.
 Rusten, Jeffrey Stuart (2012). "Matron, of Pitane". In Hornblower, Simon, et al. (ed.). The Oxford Classical Dictionary. 4th ed. Oxford University Press.
 Smith, Philip (1867). "Matron". In Smith, William (ed.). Dictionary of Greek and Roman Biography and Mythology. Vol. 2. Boston: Little, Brown, & Co.

Ancient Greek poets
4th-century BC Greek people